Mid-City Tower is a skyscraper in Mid-City Baton Rouge, Louisiana. Its exterior surface is wrapped entirely in concrete and glass.
It is currently the seventh-tallest building in Baton Rouge.

History 
In June 2013, Dean Tower was purchased and renamed Mid City Tower.

In July 2016, Mid City Tower owners filed for bankruptcy protection.

See also 
 List of tallest buildings in Baton Rouge

External links
 Dean Tower Baton Rouge Information
 Mid-City Tower website

References 

Buildings and structures in Baton Rouge, Louisiana
Skyscrapers in Louisiana
Skyscraper office buildings in Louisiana
Buildings and structures completed in 1966
1966 establishments in Louisiana